Andre Begemann and Martin Emmrich were the defending champions, but lost in the first round to Mariusz Fyrstenberg and Marcin Matkowski.
Florin Mergea and Lukáš Rosol won the title, defeating Julian Knowle and Daniel Nestor in the final, 7–5, 6–4.

Seeds

Draw

Draw

External links
 Main draw

Erste Bank Open - Doubles
2013 Doubles
Erste Bank Open Doubles